Gemology or gemmology is the science dealing with natural and artificial gemstone materials. It is a geoscience and a branch of mineralogy. Some jewelers (and many non-jewelers) are academically trained gemologists and are qualified to identify and evaluate gems.

History
Rudimentary education in gemology for jewellers and gemologists began in the nineteenth century, but the first qualifications were instigated after the National Association of Goldsmiths of Great Britain (NAG) set up a Gemmological Committee for this purpose in 1908. This committee matured into the Gemmological Association of Great Britain (also known as Gem-A), now an educational charity and accredited awarding body with its courses taught worldwide.

The first US graduate of Gem-A's diploma course, in 1929, was Robert Shipley, who later established both the Gemological Institute of America and the American Gem Society. There are now several professional schools and associations of gemologists and certification programs around the world.

The first gemological laboratory serving the jewelry trade was established in London in 1925, prompted by the influx of the newly developed "cultured pearl" and advances in the synthesis of rubies and sapphires. There are now numerous gem laboratories around the world requiring ever more advanced equipment and experience to identify the new challenges - such as treatments to gems, new synthetics, and other new materials.

Background
It is often difficult to obtain an expert judgement from a neutral laboratory. Analysis and estimation in the gemstone trade usually have to take place on site. Professional gemologists and gemstone buyers use mobile laboratories, which pool all necessary instruments in a travel case. Such so-called travel labs even have their own current supply, which makes them independent from infrastructure. They are also suitable for gemological expeditions.

Gemstones are basically categorized based on their crystal structure, specific gravity, refractive index, and other optical properties, such as pleochroism. The physical property of "hardness" is defined by the irregular Mohs scale of mineral hardness.

Gemologists study these factors while valuing or appraising cut and polished gemstones. Gemological microscopic study of the internal structure is used to determine whether a gem is synthetic or natural by revealing natural fluid inclusions or partially melted exogenous crystals that are evidence of heat treatment to enhance color.

The spectroscopic analysis of cut gemstones also allows a gemologist to understand the atomic structure and identify its origin, which is a major factor in valuing a gemstone. For example, a ruby from Burma will have definite internal and optical activity variance from a Thai ruby.

When the gemstones are in a rough state, the gemologist studies the external structure; the host rock and mineral association; and natural and polished color. Initially, the stone is identified by its color, refractive index, optical character, specific gravity, and examination of internal characteristics under magnification.

Gemological instruments
Gemologists use a variety of tools and equipment which allow for the accurate tests to be performed in order to identify a gemstone by its specific characteristics and properties.

These include:
 Corrected 10× loupe 
 Microscope
 Refractometer
 Polarising filter
 Magnifying eyepiece 
 Contact liquid for RI (refractive index) up to 1.81
 Polariscope
 Optic figure sphere
 Dichroscope 
 Spectroscope (handheld or desktop)
 Penlight
 Tweezers 
 Stone cloth 
 Color filter
 Immersion cell
 Ultraviolet lamp

General identification of gems

Gem identification is basically a process of elimination. Gemstones of similar color undergo non-destructive optical testing until there is only one possible identity.

Any single test is nearly always only indicative. For example: The specific gravity of ruby is 4.00, glass is 3.15–4.20, and cubic zirconia is 5.6–5.9 . So one can easily tell the difference between cubic zirconia and the other two; however, there is overlap between ruby and glass.

As with all naturally occurring materials, no two gems are identical. The geological environment they are created in influences the overall process so that although the basics can be identified, the presence of chemical "impurities", and substitutions along with structural imperfections create "individuals".

Identification by refractive index

One test to determine the gem's identity is to measure the refraction of light in the gem. Essentially, when light passes from one medium to another, it bends. Blue light bends more than red light. How much the light bends will vary depending on the gem mineral.

Every material has a critical angle, above which point light is reflected back internally. This can be measured and thus used to determine the gem's identity. Typically this is measured using a refractometer, although it is possible to measure it using a microscope.

Identification by specific gravity
Specific gravity, also known as relative density, varies depending upon the chemical composition and crystal structure type. Heavy liquids with a known specific gravity are used to test loose gemstones.

Specific gravity is measured by comparing the weight of the gem in air with the weight of the gem suspended in water.

Identification by spectroscopy
This method uses a similar principle to how a prism works to separate white light into its component colors. A gemological spectroscope is employed to analyze the selective absorption of light in the gem material. Coloring agents or chromophores show bands in the spectroscope and indicate which element is responsible for the gem's color.

Identification by inclusions 

Inclusions can help gemologists to determine whether or not a gemstone is natural, synthetic or treated (i.e. fracture-filled or heated).

Identification by flaws and striations 

During the Verneuil process for synthesizing gems, a fine crushed material is heated at extremely high temperatures. The powdered gem mineral is then melted (or a metallic mixture directly burned in an oxygen flame) the residue of which then drips through a furnace onto a boule. The boule where the corundum or spinel cools down and crystallizes, spins and thus causes the curved striations, which are diagnostic for a lab-created gem: Natural corundum does not show curved striations.

Likewise, natural stones, particularly beryl minerals, show small flaws – short planar cracks where the direction of the crystalline orientation in the gem abruptly changes. The natural formation of gemstones tends to layer the minerals in regular crystalline sheets, whereas many synthetically produced gems have an amorphous structure, like glass. Synthetics made by the Verneuil process either do not show flaws at all, or if any flaws are present, show curvy, undulating surfaces rather than flat ones.

Institutes, laboratories, schools, and publications

Institutes
 American Gem Society — AGS
 Asian Institute of Gemological Sciences — AIGS
 Canadian Gemmological Association — CGA
 Canadian Institute of Gemmology  — CIG
 Gemological Science International — GSI
 Gemmological Association of Australia — GAA
 Gemmological Association of Great Britain — Gem-A
 Gemological Institute of America — GIA
  Institut National de Gemmologie - ING
 International School of Gemology - ISG
 Hoge Raad voor Diamant — HRD
 International Gemological Institute — IGI
 Italian Gemmological Institute — IGI
 Institute of Gem Trading — IGT
 Gemmological Institute of India — GII
 Center of Gemological of Indonesia — COG
 Swiss Gemmological Institute — SSEF

Commercial laboratories
 American Gemological Laboratories — AGL
 European Gemological Laboratory  — EGL
 Gübelin Gem Lab — GGL
 Laboratoire français de gemmologie — LFG
 Professional gemstone testing laboratory — PGTL
 Himalaya gem testing laboratory — HGTL
 Universal Gemological Laboratories — GCI

Publications
 The Journal of Gemmology
 Gems & Gemology

Footnotes

References

 
Mineralogy
Gemological_laboratories